Dumitru Noroc (died 18 November 2020) was a Moldovan politician who served as a Deputy.

References

Date of birth missing
2020 deaths
Moldovan MPs 1990–1994